Motherjane is an Indian rock band from Kochi, India, formed in 1996. The band consists of John Thomas (drums and percussion), Clyde Rozario (bass guitar), Niranj Suresh (vocals) and Anubhav Langthasa (guitars). They have released a total of three studio albums, and five singles. Since their formation, genres like progressive rock and Carnatic music have influenced their music.

History

Formation and early days 
Motherjane was formed in 1996 by drummer John Thomas, guitarist Mithun Raju and bassist Clyde Rozario to "fill in" for another band which had backed out from a college festival at St. Albert's College, Kochi. The initial line up consisted of John Thomas (drums), Clyde Rozario (bass), Mithun Raju (guitars) and Laji and Nirmal (vocals). Vocalist Laji soon left the band and Motherjane had to continue as an instrumental band without a vocalist. In 1999 lead guitarist Mithun Raju left the band and was replaced by Baiju Dharmajan. Around that time, Motherjane used to jam at a restaurant called Ancient Mariner at Marine Drive, Kochi. In 2000, Suraj Mani, who used to perform with Bangalore based rock bands, shifted to Kochi and chanced to meet the band at the Ancient Mariner. John invited Mani to sing with the band, but he was not satisfied with the band only doing covers and not writing original material. Mani became the band's vocalist and wrote Motherjane's first original song "Disillusioned" soon after. About the same time, Motherjane recruited yet another guitarist, Rex Vijayan. Things took a slight detour after six months, when Mani moved back to Bangalore, but they continued to meet and jam as a band.

In 2008, Motherjane opened for Megadeth and Machine Head in Rock in India 2008, Bangalore and for Opeth in Saarang '08 at IIT Madras. Motherjane has been a frequent headliner of college rock festivals across India.

Motherjane was ranked No. 1 in Rock Street Journals bands of the decade in 2010. In the 2010 AVIMA Awards, Motherjane won the award for the Most Popular Act of Asia, and lead vocalist Suraj Mani was awarded Best Rock Vocalist. In the 2009 AVIMA Awards, Motherjane was awarded the Best Rock Act. They has done an OST titled 'Jihad' for the movie 'Anwar' by Amal Neerad in 2010.

In November 2010, Motherjane on their website announced guitarist Baiju Dharmajan's departure from the band to work with his new band Wrenz United.  In January 2011 Motherjane announced that Santhosh Chandran has joined the band as the band's new guitarist. In the same year, Motherjane performed at Autumn Muse, the annual cultural festival of St. John's Medical College, Bangalore. Motherjane's vocalist left the band in November 2011 citing health problems. He was replaced by Vivek Thomas who joined Motherjane in December 2011. Santhosh was replaced in 2013 by Nithin Vijayanath. Towards the end of 2012 the band started work on a new single 'Clayplay' with Rex Vijayan as producer with a vision to revamp the sound of the band. Clay play was eventually released on January 10, 2015, and marked a drastic shift in the musical direction of Motherjane. Around 2017, Niranj Suresh joined The band as the vocalist and can be deemed as the right fit for the new sounding band. The single 'Namaste' released in May 2018 is to be seen as a follow up to the change in musical style, again produced by Rex Vijayan. It hit #1 on the Apple Music rock charts in India within the 1st week of release. In June 2018 Motherjane announced on their Facebook page that they have recruited a new guitar player, Anubhav Langthasa, through auditions.

Insane Biography (2002–2003) 
Motherjane released their debut album, Insane Biography in 2002 under Kan & Will Records. The songs "Maya" and "Soul Corporations" had strong Indian musical elements which would continue in later albums. "Soul Corporations" was featured in Geki-Teki Metal, a compilation album released in Japan in 2004. Soon after the release of Insane Biography, Rex Vijayan left the band in 2003, and was replaced by Deepu Sasidharan. Sasidharan, at that time, was playing with the Kochi-based hard rock band 13AD. Insane Biography was the only Indian album to be featured in the Asian Rock Rising Festival in Japan on 1 November 2003. The band also headlined Levi's Great Indian Rock 2003.

Maktub (2008–2021) 
Maktub which was released in 2008, marked a change in Motherjane's musical style. Influence of Carnatic music was prominently seen in the guitar, vocals and percussion, and native instruments like the chenda were used. In 2009, Rolling Stone India named Maktub as the album of the year.

111 (2022) 
Songwriting started in 2018 and was completed by the beginning of 2019. The theme for this record was also metaphysical, reflecting the band's views of the existential plane. Former member and guitarist Rex Vijayan was roped in as the producer for this record also. Although the band started recording in 2019, the process was abruptly halted, first  by the 2018 Kerala floods , and then by back to back touring. It was pushed further again by the covid - 19 pandemic. The album was finally released through the band label - Motherjane Music Productions LLP on May 19, 2022.
The sound  has evolved with the passing of time, becoming more current and relevant. To add to the  post rock driven sound palette synths have been used extensively in this record. The 'Thavil' solo on the intro of 'Contact Sense' is also a new feature added to this record. The album is well received by the loyal fans and by the new listeners. Rolling Stone India magazine  has stated in their article on the release - "Clarity and confidence drive Motherjane's new EP - '1 1 1' ".

Line-up

Current members 

 John Thomas – Drums (1996–present)
 Clyde Rozario – Bass (1996–present)
 Niranj Suresh – Vocals (2017–present)
 Anubhav Langthasa – Guitars (2018 – present)
Touring Members 

 Ajay George Joseph - Guitars

Former members 
 Suraj Mani – Vocals (2000–2011)
 Baiju Dharmajan – Guitars (1999–2010)
 Rex Vijayan – Guitars (2000–2003)
 Laji George – Vocals (1996–2000)
 
 Mithun Raju – Guitars (1996–2004)
 Deepu Sasidharan – Guitars (2004-2013)
 Biju Peter – Vocals (1996– 1998)
 Deepak Dev –  Keyboards (1996–1998)
 Santhosh Chandran – Guitars (2011–2013)
 Nithin Vijayanath - Guitars (2013-2017)
Vivek Thomas - Vocals (2011-2017)

Discography

Studio albums 
 Insane Biography (2001)
 Maktub (2008)
  111 (EP) (2022)

Singles 
 Tribes of Babel (2010)
 No Contest (2011)
 Clay Play (2015)
 Namaste (2018)

References 

13.https://rollingstoneindia.com/watch-motherjanes-feisty-new-video-namaste/

.14.https://www.indulgexpress.com/culture/music/2018/may/09/listen-to-motherjanes-new-single-namaste-7246.html

15.https://www.indulgexpress.com/culture/music/2018/may/04/motherjane-is-back-7162.html

16.http://www.radioandmusic.com/entertainment/editorial/news/180512-namaste-about-recognizing-and-accepting

17.https://www.retrokolkata.com/post/motherjane

18.https://www.clubby.in/clubbytalks/motherjane-not-an-ordinary-rock-band/

19.https://www.thenewsminute.com/article/how-motherjane-carved-out-niche-itself-kerala-s-rock-scene-164710

20.https://rollingstoneindia.com/motherjane-an-indian-tale/

21.https://www.thehindu.com/todays-paper/tp-features/tp-metroplus/motherjane-set-to-play/article6769182.ece

22.https://rollingstoneindia.com/watch-motherjanes-feisty-new-video-namaste/

23.https://rollingstoneindia.com/motherjane-111-ep-interview/

24.https://www.timesmedianews.com/lifestyle/kerala-based-rock-band-motherjane-releases-its-new-ep-111/

25.https://newscinema.in/kerala-based-rock-band-motherjane-releases-its-new-ep-111

26.https://highonscore.com/in-conversation-with-motherjane-score-short-reads/

External links 
Official Website
 https://www.facebook.com/MotherjaneOfficial/
 https://www.instagram.com/motherjane/

Indian progressive rock groups
Musical groups established in 1996
Musicians from Kochi
Indian rock music groups
Music bands from Kerala